Ashtabula was a disused Lake Shore and Michigan Southern Railway depot in Ashtabula, Ohio. It was built in 1901 to replace an older depot on the same line. The depot was located on West Thirty-second Street.

As of 2012, the depot was used as a signal house for CSX.

CSX demolished the depot by June 2018.

History
Ashtabula station was within 1000 feet of the Ashtabula River railroad disaster in 1876.

References

External links 
ASHTABULA COUNTY Railroad Depots

Railway stations in the United States opened in 1901
Former railway stations in Ohio
Former New York Central Railroad stations
Railway stations closed in 1971